The Armenian eternity sign (⟨֎ ֍⟩) or Arevakhach ("Sun Cross") is an ancient Armenian national symbol  and a symbol of the national identity of the Armenian people. It is one of the most common symbols in Armenian architecture, carved on khachkars and on walls of churches.

Evolution and use
In medieval Armenian culture, the eternity sign symbolized the concept of everlasting, celestial life. Since the 5th century, it appeared on Armenian steles; later it became part of khachkar symbolism. Around the 8th century the use of the Armenian symbol of eternity had become a long established national iconographical practice, and it has kept its meaning in modern times. Besides being one of the main components of khachkars, it can be found on church walls, tomb stones and other architectural monuments. Notable churches with the eternity sign include the Mashtots Hayrapet Church of Garni, Horomayr Monastery, Nor Varagavank, Tsitsernavank Monastery. An identical symbol appears in the reliefs of the Divriği Great Mosque and Hospital, and is likely a borrowing from earlier Armenian churches of the area. It can also be found on Armenian manuscripts.

The eternity sign is used on the logos of government agencies and on commemorative coins, as well as Armenian government agencies and non-government organizations and institutions in Armenia and the Armenian diaspora.

The symbol is also used by Armenian neopagan organizations and their followers. It is called by them "Arevakhach" ("sun cross").

ArmSCII and Unicode 

In ArmSCII, Armenian Standard Code for Information Interchange, an Armenian eternity sign has been encoded in 7-bit and 8-bit standard and ad hoc encodings since at least 1987. In 2010 the Armenian National Institute of Standards suggested encoding an Armenian Eternity sign in the Unicode character set, and both left-facing ⟨֎⟩ and right-facing ⟨֍⟩ Armenian eternity signs were included in Unicode version 7.0 when it was released in June 2014.

Gallery 
Churches

Modern statues and sculptures 

Logos

See also 
 Borjgali
 Castro culture (Economy and Arts, Stonework, Metallurgy)
 Hilarri (Basque steles)
 Khachkar
 Lists of national symbols
 Petroglyph
 Pictish stone
 Picture stones of Gotland
 Triskelion

References

External links

Hayastan All Armenian Fund. Telethon 2010 – Water is Life.  "Water is Life indeed and as you can see in the design, the water turns into the Armenian eternity symbol as it flows out of the helping hands."
Downtown, North End. "Armenian Heritage Park to participate Saturday in World Labyrinth Day", Posted by Jeremy C. Fox  April 29, 2013. – "A single jet of water and the symbol of eternity mark its center, representing hope and rebirth."
Armenian Engineers & Scientists of America. "The Armenian Engineers and Scientists of America (AESA) logo is an ancient symbol used in Armenian architecture and carvings. The symbol signifies Eternal Life – in Armenian Haverjoutian Nshan or Sign of Eternity."
Armenian Monuments Awareness Project

Armenian mythology
ArmSCII
National symbols of Armenia
Time in Armenia
Rotational symmetry
Ancient Armenian religion